
The Masherbrum Mountains are a subrange of the Karakoram mountains, located in Ghanche District in the Baltistan region of Pakistan-administered Kashmir.

Geography
The Masherbrum Mountains are located on the south side of the Baltoro Glacier. The southern side of the range, in the Indus River basin, is drained by the Hushe River.

While not as famous as the Baltoro Muztagh mountains, which lies across the Baltoro Glacier, the Masherbrum Mountains contain some of the highest peaks in the world (highest ). They attract climbers from around the planet.

Selected peaks
(This is a common criterion for peaks of this stature to be independent.)

Other peaks
Other notable peaks include the following ones in the Hushe Valley region:
 Link Sar, 7,041 m
 K7, 6,934 m
 Kapura, 6,544 m
 Drifika, 6,447 m

See also

 List of mountains in Pakistan
 List of highest mountains

Sources
 Jerzy Wala, Orographical Sketch Map of the Karakoram, Swiss Foundation for Alpine Research, Zurich, 1990.
 Andy Fanshawe and Stephen Venables, Himalaya Alpine-Style, Hodder and Stoughton, 1995.

Mountain ranges of the Karakoram
Mountain ranges of Gilgit-Baltistan